Dieter Freise (18 February 1945 – 5 April 2018) was a field hockey player from Germany, who was a member of the West German squad that won the gold medal at the 1972 Summer Olympics in Munich. He also competed in the 1976 Summer Olympics, where the West German team finished fifth. He was born in Heidelberg.

References
Dieter Freise's profile at Sports Reference.com
Dieter Freise's obituary

External links
 

1947 births
2018 deaths
German male field hockey players
Field hockey players at the 1972 Summer Olympics
Field hockey players at the 1976 Summer Olympics
Olympic field hockey players of West Germany
Medalists at the 1972 Summer Olympics
Olympic medalists in field hockey
Olympic gold medalists for West Germany
Sportspeople from Heidelberg
20th-century German people